Thomas Murray (born 1 June 1943) is a Scottish former footballer, who played as a midfielder and forward.

Murray started his career with Airdrieonians in 1960 where he made nearly 200 appearances and also had long spells at Carlisle United and Heart of Midlothian. Murray subsequently played for Eastern AA, Brisbane City, Arbroath and Raith Rovers.

References

External links

Tommy Murray, London Hearts

1943 births
Living people
Scottish footballers
Airdrieonians F.C. (1878) players
Heart of Midlothian F.C. players
Carlisle United F.C. players
Eastern Sports Club footballers
Brisbane City FC players
Arbroath F.C. players
Raith Rovers F.C. players
Bo'ness United F.C. players
Scottish Football League players
English Football League players
Scottish expatriate footballers
Expatriate footballers in Hong Kong
Expatriate soccer players in Australia
Association football forwards
Scottish expatriate sportspeople in Hong Kong
Scottish expatriate sportspeople in Australia